The Clown is a series published in the comic anthology 2000 AD between 1992 and 1994. It was created by Igor Goldkind and Robert Bliss. The story is about a clown who goes on a violent rampage to avenge the decapitation of his pony Toby.

Creation and concept 
Igor Goldkind was originally hired to launch Crisis and later worked in PR for 2000 AD before eventually contributing one-off stories to both Crisis and Tharg's Future Shocks. He developed The Clown as a series for 2000 AD and intended it to be a fond parody of Neil Gaiman’s divisive literary writing style, describing it as “The Sandman on laughing gas”.

Goldkind portrays the Clown as an “existential Mr. Magoo [...] more fixated on his ideas about reality than reality itself” and credits The Sorrows of Young Werther as an inspiration for the series’s satirical, solipsistic "metaphysical slapstick".

Publication History 
 "The Clown Book 1" (in 2000 AD #774-779, 1992)
 "The Clown Book 2: Prologue" (in 2000 AD #841, 1993)
 "Vale of Tears" (with Greg Staples, in 2000 AD Yearbook 1994, 1993)
 "The Clown Book 2" (with Robert Bliss/Greg Staples/Nick Percival, in 2000 AD #881-888, 1994)
The first book was reprinted in Classic 2000 AD #10-11, 1996

References

External links 
The 2000 AD A.B.C. #26: The Clown at YouTube

1992 comics debuts
1993 comics endings
Parody comics
Parodies of comics
2000 AD comic strips
2000 AD characters
Comics characters introduced in 1992
Fictional clowns